The Catholic University of Salvador (UCSal) is a private and non-profit Catholic university, located in Salvador, the first capital of Brazil, and fourth largest city of Brazil. It is maintained by the Catholic Archdiocese of Salvador.

Undergraduate Courses

Postgraduate lato sensu Courses

Postgraduate stricto sensu Courses

Master Degree

Doctorate Degree

Notable alumni

Alumni 
Notable Catholic University of Salvador alumni include:

 Augusto Aras, current Prosecutor General of Brazil
 Luislinda Valois, jurist, former Desembargadora of the State of Bahia, former Secretary of Promotion of Racial Equality and former Minister of Human Rights
 Otto Alencar, Senator from Bahia
 Ana Arraes, Vice President of the Tribunal de Contas da União
 João Henrique Carneiro, politician and former Mayor of Salvador
 Bruno Soares Reis, politician and current Mayor of Salvador after Antônio Carlos Magalhães Neto
 Daniel Almeida, current member of the Chamber of Deputies in Brazil representing the State of Bahia
 Claudia Leitte, axé and pop singer
 João José Reis, writer and one of the most important historians in Brazil, considered a world reference for the study of history and slavery in the 19th century
 Cristiano Chaves de Farias, Prosecutor of the Public Prosecutor's Office of the State of Bahia and writer
 José Medrado, lecturer and medium, founder of Centro Espírita Cavaleiros da Luz (Knights of Light Spiritist Center)

References

External links
 Official website

Educational institutions established in 1961
Universities and colleges in Salvador, Bahia
Catholic universities and colleges in Brazil
1961 establishments in Brazil